Thomas and Walter Monteith House, also known as the Monteith House Museum was the first frame house built in Albany, Oregon, United States. It was built by Walter and Thomas Monteith in 1848–1850. All the house's original boards are hand-hewn due to lack of availability of steam-powered buzzsaws at that time.  Originally the home served as a combination dwelling and store, but soon became the residence of Thomas and Christine (Dunbar) Monteith.  Described architecturally as "Rural Vernacular / Pre-Classic Revival," the house was extensively remodeled in 1855 and 1880, moved 50 feet west in 1901, and in 1922 again remodeled, such that the structure little resembled the original construction.  The house was placed on the National Register of Historic Places in 1975.  Beginning in 1982 the house has been a museum highlighting the Monteiths' contributions to the area's community.  "Living history" events are periodically given at the museum.

References

External links
Monteith House (official site)
Illustrating Four Treatments in Oregon article on restoration of the house from the National Park Service

Buildings and structures in Albany, Oregon
Museums in Linn County, Oregon
Historic house museums in Oregon
National Register of Historic Places in Linn County, Oregon
Houses on the National Register of Historic Places in Oregon
Houses completed in 1849
1850 establishments in Oregon Territory
Houses in Linn County, Oregon